Christine Bongo Lumengu (born 24 July 1988), known as Christine Bongo, is a DR Congolese footballer who plays as a midfielder. She has been a member of the DR Congo women's national team.

Club career
Bongo has played for La Colombe Brazzaville in the Republic of the Congo and for Force Terrestre in the Democratic Republic of the Congo.

International career
Bongo was capped for the DR Congo at senior level during the 2006 African Women's Championship.

See also
 List of Democratic Republic of the Congo women's international footballers

References

1988 births
Living people
Democratic Republic of the Congo women's footballers
Women's association football midfielders
Democratic Republic of the Congo women's international footballers
Democratic Republic of the Congo expatriate footballers
Democratic Republic of the Congo expatriate sportspeople in the Republic of the Congo
Expatriate footballers in the Republic of the Congo
21st-century Democratic Republic of the Congo people